The Pyamalaw River (Pyanmalot River) is a river in Ayeyawady Division in south-western Burma (Myanmar).  It is a distributary of the Irrawaddy. The Pyamalaw River forms the boundary between Wakema Township and Einme Township of Ayeyawady Region.

It is to be crossed by the Kyungon Bridge.

Notes

Ayeyarwady Region
Rivers of Myanmar